John Frederick Coots (May 2, 1897 – April 8, 1985) was an American songwriter. He composed over 700 popular songs and over a dozen Broadway shows. In 1934, Coots wrote the melody with his then chief collaborator, lyricist Haven Gillespie, for the biggest hit of either man's career, "Santa Claus Is Comin' to Town." The song became one of the biggest sellers in American history.

In 1934, when Gillespie brought him the lyrics to "Santa Claus Is Coming to Town", Coots came up with the outline of the melody in just ten minutes. Coots took the song to his publisher, Leo Feist, who liked it but thought it was "a kids' song" and didn't expect too much from it.  Coots offered the song to Eddie Cantor who used it on his radio show that November and it became an instant hit. The morning after the radio show there were orders for 100,000 copies of sheet music and by Christmas sales had passed 400,000.

Career timeline 
 1897 May 2 – born in Brooklyn, New York
 1914 (age 17) – began work with Farmers' Loan & Trust Co. in New York
 1916 (age 20) – first hit song published, "Mr. Ford You've Got the Right Idea," words by Ray Sherwood, music by Coots; A. J. Stasny Music Co., publisher 
 1919 (age 22) – Actor-producer Eddie Dowling gave Coots his first chance at writing a musical score for Friars' Frolics
 1922 (age 25) – Dowling commissioned Coots to write the songs for Sally, Irene and Mary, a show which ran for two years on Broadway
 1928 (age 31) – wrote "Doin' the Raccoon"
 1929 (age 32) – moved to Hollywood, California
 1931 (age 34) – wrote "Love Letters in the Sand"
 1934 (age 37) – wrote the songs "Santa Claus Is Comin' to Town" (over 4 million copies of sheet music sold) and "For All We Know"
 1940 (age 43) – wrote "The Rangers' Victory Song"; 
 1985 (age 87) April 8 – died in a New York City hospital, after a lengthy illness

Selected songs 
 "Santa Claus Is Comin' to Town," words by Haven Gillespie, music by Coots
 Leo Feist, Inc., publisher (1934); 
 © September 27, 1934, Class E unpublished 93634, Leo Feist, Inc., New York
 © October 23, 1934, Class E published 44456, October 25, 1934, Leo Feist, Inc.
 © Renewal September 27, 1961, R28248025, Haven Gillespie and J. Fred Coots
 © Renewal October 25, 1961, R283907, Haven Gillespie and J. Fred Coots

 "You Go to My Head," words by Haven Gillespie, music by Coots
 Remick Music (1938); 

 "Louisiana Fairy Tale," words and music by Mitchell Parish, Haven Gillespie, and Coots
 Mills Music (1935); 
 © April 5, 1935, Class E 47450, Mills Music, Inc., New York

 "For All We Know," words by Sam M. Lewis, music by Coots
 Leo Feist, Inc. (1934); 
 © March 14, 1934, Class E unpublished 84751, Leo Feist, Inc., New York

 "I Still Get a Thrill (Thinking of You)," words by Benny Davis, music by Coots
 Davis, Coots & Engel (1930); 

 "There's Honey On The Moon Tonight," words by Haven Gillespie and Mack Davis, music by Coots
 Miller Music, Inc. (1938);

Selected musicals 
 Sally, Irene and Mary, music by Coots, words by Raymond W. Klages (1888–1947), March 23, 1925 – April 4, 1925 & September 4, 1922 – June 2, 1923 
 "Kid Days" 
 "Time Will Tell" 
 "Pals"
 "Stage Door Johnnies"
 "I Wonder Why" 
 "Do You Remember?"
 "How I've Missed You Mary" 
 "Right Boy Comes Along"
 "Our Home Sweet Home"
 "Peacock Alley"
 "Something in Here"
 "Opportunity"
 "We Are Waiting"
 "Clouds Roll By" 
 "Until You Say Yes"
 "Wedding Time"
 "Old Fashioned Gown" 
 "When a Regular Boy Loves a Regular Girl" 
 "Up on Fifth Avenue Near Central Park"
 "Jimmy" 

 Sons O' Guns, music by Coots, November 26, 1929 – August 9, 1930
 Broadway Nights, featuring songs by Coots, July 15, 1929 – August 17, 1929
 George White's Scandals, musical review, featuring songs by Coots, July 2, 1928 – January 19, 1929
 White Lights, music by Coots, October 11, 1927 – November 5, 1927
 Gay Paree, musical review, music and lyrics by Coots, November 9, 1926 – April 9, 1927 & August 18, 1925 – January 30, 1926
 A Night in Paris, musical review, music by Coots, July 26, 1926 – October 30, 1926 & January 5, 1926 – July 10, 1926
 The Merry World, musical review, music by Coots, June 8, 1926 – August 21, 1926
 Mayflowers, music by Coots, November 24, 1925 – January 30, 1926
 June Days, musical, music by Coots, August 6, 1925 – October 17, 1925
 Artists and Models, musical review, music by Coots, June 24, 1925 – May 7, 1926
 Artists and Models, musical review, music by Coots, October 15, 1924 – May 23, 1925
 Innocent Eyes, musical review, additional music by Coots, May 20, 1924 – August 30, 1924
 Dew Drop Inn, musical comedy, featuring songs by Coots, May 17, 1923 – August 25, 1923
 Spice of 1922, musical review, music by Coots, July 6, 1922 – September 9, 1922

External links 
 
 Entry at Songwriters Hall of Fame (includes a complete list of compositions)
 J. Fred Coots recordings at the Discography of American Historical Recordings.

Notes and references 
Notes

Original copyrights
 Catalog of Copyright Entries, Part 3 Musical Compositions, New Series, Library of Congress, Copyright Office

Copyright renewals
 Catalog of Copyright Entries, Part 3, Musical Compositions, Third Series, Library of Congress, Copyright Office

Inline citations

1897 births
1985 deaths
20th-century American composers
20th-century American musicians
Broadway composers and lyricists
Musicians from New York City
Songwriters from New York (state)